Megachile alopecura is a species of bee in the family Megachilidae. It was described by Theodore Dru Alison Cockerell in 1923.

References

Alopecura
Insects described in 1923